Profanatica is a black metal band from New York. They are one of the first black metal bands from the United States (alongside Von formed in 1987), and are among the major American black metal bands to have emerged early during the second wave of black metal.  Under the direction of Paul Ledney they have placed profound emphasis on blasphemous themes.

History

Initial formation (1990–1992) 
After the founding members of death metal band Incantation split ways due to artistic differences, Paul Ledney, Aragon Amori, and Brett Makowski adopted the name Profanatica while John McEntee continued as Incantation. In an interview, it was implied that Ledney did not recognise the legitimacy of Incantation under McEntee, and he claimed that it was he, Amori, and Makowski who originally proposed the name. He has also claimed that McEntee was reluctant to pursue their interests in black metal, corpse paint, and blasphemous themes. However, both parties have remained on good terms, and have often collaborated.

In the summer of 1990, they released their first demo Putrescence Of..., followed by Broken Throne of Christ in December. Brett Makowski was unable to participate in the recording of the latter demo, so the band recruited John Gelso to play guitar. Both demo tapes eventually caught the interest of After World Records. The band signed a deal with the label and in 1991 they released Weeping in Heaven on 7-inch EP, strictly limited to 500 hand-numbered copies. Following the success of this EP, After World chose to re-release it on cassette with two bonus live tracks the following year. Also in 1992, the band signed a deal with French label Osmose Productions to release a second EP. The EP turned out to be a split 12-inch with the Colombian band Masacre.

During this time, Profanatica extensively toured the northeastern United States, often shocking many with their sick and blasphemous live act. As the end of the year approached, Brett Makowski and John Gelso both officially left the band. Paul and Aragon invited Wicked Warlock of Demonic Blasphemy (nowadays known as Ixithra) of the band Demoncy, to perform the guitar work. The three of them played one gig together, and were planned to participate in an American black metal festival that Halloween, appearing with bands such as Order from Chaos, Vital Remains, and Acheron; however, this never took place.

The band entered the studio to record a full-length release, initially entitled The Raping of the Virgin Mary, although in other instances the name was known as Sodomy of Sacred Assholes. The master tapes of these recordings were destroyed (according to Ledney, by Aragon and Ixithra from Demoncy) in the studio, and the band parted ways soon after. Following the end of Profanatica, Ledney formed Havohej. Although Profanatica had split up, several records were released, all of which are official.

Reunion 
In early 2001, Paul Ledney recruited two new members and resurrected Profanatica. Their first full-length album Profanatitas de Domonatia was released in 2007. In late 2007, Ledney announced that both Profanatica and Havohej were back, and that Profanatica would headline the Sacrifice of the Nazarene Child Fest Texas the following summer.  On August 16, 2010, Profanatica released its second full-length album, Disgusting Blasphemies Against God.  On November 26, 2013, Profanatica released their third full-length studio album, Thy Kingdom Cum. Profanatica released their fourth album The Curling flame of Blasphemy on July 22, 2016. In 2016 longtime guitarist and bassist John Gelso exited the band and was replaced by Ryan Adams. The band released the EP Altar of the Virgin Whore on November 2, 2018.

Musical style and ideology 
Profanatica's music is influenced by Possessed, old Venom, old Bathory, Hellhammer, Necrovore and Sarcófago, and is close to death metal. According to both Proscriptor and Tony Laureano, they are among the first American black metal bands, although Laureano considers them to be obviously death metal. The second demo was recorded quickly after the third one because they "wanted something more raw", like Necrovore's demo. Their songs "are very simple in structure so anyone can really play them. The trick is to play them aggressive like Gelso does." The music is written by Ledney and John Gelso.

The lyrics are about blasphemy and profanation of "anything sacred and holy". Ledney writes "most of the blasphemies and Aragon does most of the lyrics". A Profanatica video showed the bassist ejaculating unto a bible and Ledney licking it up; the latter claims they are "definitely not homos". Asked how deeply he is into Satanism, Ledney replied Profanatica were "into our own deal" and had their own beliefs, making "our own Satanism" and being "into black perversion. We shit on God. We are larger than God and he is smaller than us. That's the way we think. We put down false religions." He does consider himself a Satanist, while "a lot of other people wouldn't". He believes he is his own God and does not "believe Satan is an actual entity. It's just a worship figure, but a lot of people do think of Satan as a real god. Maybe they're crazy, why should their 'master' care about someone like them anyhow?" His beliefs are mostly drawn from Aleister Crowley, whose Book of the Law "really opened my eyes. Satanism is anti-religion. I don't believe in any Gods. I suppose it's good that some people gather for black masses with their corresponding dark beliefs, but I think everybody should think for themselves. If everyone thought the same way then that would be hell on earth." Asked about Anton LaVey, he replied that "he doesn't look too good in that little devil costume he wears. I wore one of those costumes for Halloween when I was nine with the pitchfork and that's all I'm gonna say..." He does not agree with the views of the Church of Satan, referring to an ad for a Baphomet mug in their magazine The Black Flame for around $15.95 which he called "the most ridiculous thing I've ever seen" and "money-making junk". He rejects "Satanic churches and so forth" as "just more organized religion". Asked about the Necronomicon, he replied "it was written as a joke – kind of. But I think it was 1/2 real and 1/2 fake. HP Lovecraft is a great writer. One of my favorites. But if someone believes in Pazuzu, then he exists. That's the way I look at it."

Ledney called the Norwegian bands "kinda a joke. Anyone can take a lot of drugs and put on make-up, that's what I think. […] Bands that claim they're true aren't true! That's like someone saying how big their cock is. It's definitely small! If they talk about it all the time. Except for us." He would not "really put a label on where bands are from", but called the Swedish scene "definitely retarded and Norway is not far behind that. There's so many bands that play the same style and rip off from each other and other bands, that it's just ridiculously fake!" As Profanatica were rejected by Varg Vikernes from the Norwegian band Burzum, Ledney replied that "the only reason for his hatred is jealousy". According to him, "95% of the bands from Norway and all of Europe can't play their instruments at all. I don't even call it music. I just call it a sad attempt at Black Metal. […] I think Europe is making it trendy with all of the bands from Norway. They use samples on the guitars and they just don't know how to play. […] The only band I like from Norway is IMMORTAL." Asked to mention bands he "think[s] are true Black Metallers", he named Impaled Nazarene and Beherit from Finland, Necromantia and Rotting Christ from Greece, and Bestial Summoning from the Netherlands.

The album Profanatitas de Domonatia differs from early releases in terms of productions, which "happened on purpose. That was the sound we were trying to get all these years. More of a thick INCANTATION feel to it. PROFANATICA has not changed our style / ideas since 1990, unlike other bands."

Lineup

Current lineup 
 Paul Ledney – vocals, drums (1990–1992, 2001–present)
 Richard Olseen – bass (2018–present)
 Pat Davies – bass (2020–present) *Live*
 Adam Besserer – guitars (2018–present)

Former members 
Guitars:
 Brett Makowski (1990–1992)
 Wicked Warlock (1992)
 Rod Ware (2001–2006)
 John Gelso (1990–1992, 2007–2016)
 Ryan Adams – guitars (2016–2018)

Bass:
 Aragon Amori (1990–1992)
 Malcolm Tent (2001–2006)
 Alex Cox (2007–2018)

Discography

Albums 
 Profanatitas de Domonatia (2007)
 Disgusting Blasphemies Against God (2010)
 Thy Kingdom Cum (2013)
 The Curling Flame of Blasphemy (2016)
 Rotting Incarnation of Christ (2019)

Compilations 
 Profanatica – Live (2000)
 The Enemy of Virtue (2006)
 Sickened by Holy Host (The Grand Masters Session) (2012)

EPs 
 Weeping in Heaven (1991)
 Altar of the Virgin Whore (2018)

Singles 
 Broken Jew (2002)

Demos 
 Official Rehearsal Tape (1990)
 Putrescence Of... (re-released in 1993 as As Tears of Blood Stain the Altar of Christ) (1990)
 Broken Throne of Christ (1990)

Splits 
 Ola de Violencia/Tormenting Holy Flesh (with Masacre, 1992)
 Unholy Masters of Darkness (with Impiety, 1999)
 Trampling the Holy Faith (with Goatsodomy, Nuclear Desecration and Unholy Crucifix, 2008)

DVDs 
 The Enemy of Virtue (2008)

References

External links 
 Official Profanatica Myspace

American black metal musical groups
Musical groups established in 1990